Christos Spyrou (born  in Athens) is a Greek male weightlifter, competing in the 85 kg category and representing Greece at international competitions. He participated at the 1996 Summer Olympics in the 70 kg event and at the 2000 Summer Olympics in the 85 kg event. He competed at world championships, most recently at the 1999 World Weightlifting Championships.

His father Panagiotis Spyrou was also a weightlifter and competed at the 1972 Summer Olympics (75 kg event).

Major results

References

External links
 

1976 births
Living people
Greek male weightlifters
Weightlifters at the 1996 Summer Olympics
Weightlifters at the 2000 Summer Olympics
Olympic weightlifters of Greece
Sportspeople from Athens
World Weightlifting Championships medalists
Mediterranean Games bronze medalists for Greece
Mediterranean Games medalists in weightlifting
Mediterranean Games silver medalists for Greece
Competitors at the 2001 Mediterranean Games
20th-century Greek people
21st-century Greek people